First of May (French: Premier mai) is a 1958 French-Italian comedy film directed by Luis Saslavsky and starring Yves Montand, Yves Noël and Nicole Berger.

Cast
 Yves Montand as Jean Meunier  
 Yves Noël as François Meunier  
 Nicole Berger as Annie Chapois 
 Georges Chamarat as Henri Bousquet  
 Bernadette Lange as Thérèse Meunier  
 Georgette Anys as Mme Tartet  
 Gabrielle Fontan as Mme Lurde  
 Maurice Biraud as Blanchot  
 Paul Demange as Le secrétaire du commissaire  
 Laurent Terzieff as Maurice  
 Gaby Basset as Une infirmière  
 Jacques Berger 
 Simone Berthier as La bru de Bousquet  
 Louis Bugette as Le patron du bistrot 
 Coutan-Lambert as Mme Chapuis 
 Marie Glory as Une infirmière  
 Gina Manès as Une commère  
 Robert Pizani as Saint-Bertin  
 Nicole Riche as Une entraîneuse  
 Alice Sapritch as Une entraîneuse  
 Yvette Sautereau 
 Pierre Sergeol 
 Paul Uny
 Walter Chiari as Gilbert  
 Aldo Fabrizi as Le vieux camionneur

References

Bibliography 
 Rège, Philippe. Encyclopedia of French Film Directors, Volume 1. Scarecrow Press, 2009.

External links 
 

1958 comedy films
French comedy films
1958 films
Italian comedy films
1950s French-language films
Films directed by Luis Saslavsky
1950s French films
1950s Italian films